Power Inc. Volume 3 (Live) is a live performance compilation album by the industrial hip-hop group Tackhead. It was released on November 4, 1997 on Blanc Records.

Track listing

Personnel 

Tackhead
Keith LeBlanc – drums, sampler
Skip McDonald – guitar, sampler
Adrian Sherwood – effects, mixing
Doug Wimbish – bass guitar, sampler

Additional musicians
Gary Clail – vocals (24)
Bernard Fowler – vocals (4)
Melle Mel – vocals (25)
Mark Stewart – vocals (16)

Release history

References

External links 
 

1997 compilation albums
1997 live albums
Tackhead albums